Ryan W. Grim (born March 23, 1978) is an American author and journalist. Grim was Washington, D.C. bureau chief for HuffPost and is the Washington, D.C. bureau chief for The Intercept. He is also a political commentator for Breaking Points and appears frequently on The Majority Report with Sam Seder. His writings have appeared in several publications, including Rolling Stone, The Washington Post, and Politico. He is the author of This Is Your Country on Drugs and We've Got People. He cofounded Strong Arm Press, an independent progressive publishing house. Grim and The Federalist editor Emily Jashinsky were the regular Friday hosts of Rising. They resigned in September 2022 and joined Breaking Points, where they host Counterpoints on Fridays.

Early life and education 
Grim was born in Still Pond, Maryland. He earned a Bachelor of Arts degree in Philosophy from St. Mary's College of Maryland, and Master of Public Policy from the University of Maryland, College Park.

Career
After earning his master's degree, Grim worked as a legislative analyst for the Marijuana Policy Project. He also worked as a stockbroker in New York City.

Grim has written about the history of drug use and drug culture in the United States. He has presented his research on why drugs are popular at certain times in history, and his thoughts on the government's war on drugs. He formerly worked as a junior staffer at the Marijuana Policy Project.

Grim joined HuffPost (then The Huffington Post) in January 2009. In his role heading a team at HuffPost, reporters on the team twice made finalist for the Pulitzer Prize. Towards the end of his tenure at HuffPost, significant leadership changes were occurring, sparked by Arianna Huffington's exit. Grim left his position at HuffPost in 2017 after nine years with the paper, joining The Intercept to head their Washington, D.C. bureau.

Following the move to The Intercept, Grim and Alex Lawson established Strong Arm Press, a small imprint printing press. Grim decided to launch the press because he felt that the Trump administration was moving too quickly for the standard publishing cycle, which tends to take around a year to publish a book. He launched Strong Arm Press to accommodate shorter, cheaper, lower-volume books with a shorter publishing turnaround-time. The first title published was Out of the Ooze, a profile of Tom Price which reached Amazon's top 100 list. Books are funded through crowdfunding campaigns. Grim published We've Got People, a history on progressivism and the Democratic Party, through Strong Arm Press in 2019.

Noted reportage 
During the Brett Kavanaugh Supreme Court nomination, Grim was the first to report that California Senator Dianne Feinstein had received a letter related to Kavanaugh, which was later revealed to be from Christine Blasey Ford alleging that Kavanaugh had sexually assaulted her in high school. Grim also reported on former Trump aide Rob Porter's abuse allegations by his ex-wives. He reported early on the 2018 campaign of Alexandria Ocasio-Cortez.

In 2016, Grim published a blog post in which he questioned FiveThirtyEight models and predictions for the 2016 United States presidential election. Grim's criticisms were later repudiated by FiveThirtyEight founder Nate Silver, and Grim issued corrections to his original blog post.

In August 2020, Grim used emails from University of Massachusetts College Democrats to dismantle an attempt to smear progressive candidate Alex Morse.

Publications
 This Is Your Country on Drugs: The Secret History of Getting High in America; Publisher: Wiley (June 22, 2009) .
 We've Got People: From Jesse Jackson to Alexandria Ocasio-Cortez, the End of Big Money and the Rise of a Movement (May 2019)

References

External links
 

1978 births
Living people
21st-century American journalists
American drug policy reform activists
Journalists from Maryland
The Young Turks people
University of Maryland, College Park alumni